Psoralis is a genus of skippers in the family Hesperiidae.

Species
Recognised species in the genus Psoralis  include:
 Psoralis arva (Evans, 1955)
 Psoralis calcarea (Schaus, 1902)
 Psoralis idee Weeks, 1901
 Psoralis laska (Evans, 1955)
 Psoralis pamba (Evans, [1955])
 Psoralis sabina Freeman, 1969
 Psoralis stacara Schaus, 1902
 Psoralis umbrata (Erschoff, 1876)
 Psoralis visendus (E. Bell, 1942)

Former species
Psoralis alis Bell, 1959 - synonymized with Chitta chittara (Schaus, 1902)
Psoralis concolor Nicolay, 1980 - transferred to Ralis concolor (Nicolay, 1980)
Psoralis darienensis Gaviria, Siewert, Mielke and Casagrande, 2018 - transferred to Alychna darienensis (Gaviria, Siewert, Mielke and Casagrande, 2018)
Psoralis mirnae Siewert, Nakamura and Mielke, 2014 - transferred to Alychna mirnae (Siewert, Nakamura and Mielke, 2014)
Psoralis sabaeus Mabille, 1904 - synonymized with Pamphila idee Weeks, 1901
Psoralis venta Evans, 1955 - transferred to Alychna venta (Evans, 1955)

References

Natural History Museum Lepidoptera genus database

Hesperiinae
Hesperiidae genera